Amirhossein Yahyazadeh (born 17 February 1998) is an Iranian footballer who plays as a winger, currently playing for Iranian club Pars Jonoubi Jam in the Persian Gulf Pro League.

Club career

Naft Tehran
He made his debut for Naft Tehran in 21 fixtures of the 2017–18 Iran Pro League against Gostaresh Foulad.

References

1998 births
Living people
Iranian footballers
Naft Tehran F.C. players
Pars Jonoubi Jam players
Khooneh be Khooneh players
People from Babolsar
Association football midfielders
Sportspeople from Mazandaran province